Urška is a Slovene feminine given name.

It may refer to:

 Urška Arlič Gololičič, Slovenian opera singer
 Urška Bratuša, Slovenian football player
 Urška Bravec, Slovenian cyclist
 Urška Bračko, Slovenian model
 Urška Hrovat, Slovenian skier
 Urška Poje, Slovenian biathlete
 Urška Rabič, Slovenian skier
 Urška Vesenjak, Slovenian tennis player
 Urška Žigart, Slovenian cyclist
 Urška Žolnir, Slovenian judoka

See also
 Urša

Slovene feminine given names